Julius D. Kaplan is an American art historian who in 1999 was appointed professor of art at California State University. He made his name through his studies of the art of Gustave Moreau, about which he has published two books, the first of which, The art of Gustave Moreau: Theory, style and content (1972), was an elaboration of his PhD thesis.

Selected publications
"The religious subjects of James Ensor, 1877-1900", Revue Belge d'Archéologie et d'Histoire de l'Art, 1966.
"Gustave Moreau's 'Jupiter and Semele'." Art Quarterly, 33 (1970), pp. 393–414.
The art of Gustave Moreau: Theory, style and content. Columbia University, New York, 1972.
Gustave Moreau. Los Angeles County Museum of Art & New York Graphic Society, Los Angeles & New York, 1974. 
Symbolism: Europe and America at the end of the nineteenth century. An exhibition at the Art Gallery California State College, San Bernardino, April 27 - June 10, 1980. California State College, 1980. 
Kate Steinitz art and collection: Avant garde art in Germany in the 1920s and 1930s. San Bernardino State College, 1982.

References 

Year of birth missing (living people)
Living people
American art historians
California State University, San Bernardino faculty
Gustave Moreau